Anthopleura anjunae is a species of sea anemone. It is found in South and Southeast Asia.

References 

Animals described in 1993
Actiniidae